The Senate of Republika Srpska is consultative body of the highest constitutive institutions of Republika Srpska, an entity within Bosnia and Herzegovina. Its organization and functions are regulated with the Constitution of the Republika Srpska and Law on the Senate of Republika Srpska. According to the initial text of the law of 1997 only Serbs could be appointed as members of the senate. The European Commission for Democracy through Law reported in 2001 that this was abrogate discriminatory and obviously unconstitutional. The law has been changed in 2010 and allowed people of any ethnicity to be appointed as members of the senate.

Members 
Members of the Senate are:

 Aleksa Buha
 Milutin Vujić
 Milutin Vučkovac
 Elena Guskova
 Milorad Zakić
 Ljubomir Zuković
 Milivoje Ivanišević
 Duško Jakšić
 Nenad Kecmanović
 Fuad Turalić
 Predrag Lazarević
 Arie Livne
 Savo Lončar
 Vladimir Lukić
 Zdravko Marjanac
 Ivanka Šego
 Manojlo Milovanović
 Stevo Mirjanić
 Mitropolit Nikolaj
 Svetozar Mihajlović
 Milimir Mučibabić
 Bosa Nenadić
 Rajko Petrov Nogo
 Slobodan Pavlović
 Borislav Paravac
 Slobodan Perović
 Nikola Poplašen
 Živko Radišić
 Ranko Risojević
 Željko Rodić
 Radmila Smiljanić
 Slavenko Terzić
 Milan Tomić
 Ivan Tomljenović
 Jovica Trkulja
 Branko Tupanjac

References

External links 
 Article number 89 of the Constitution of Republika Srpska
 Law on the Senate of Republika Srpska
 Members of the Senate of Republika Srpska

Politics of Republika Srpska